Tyler Robinson may refer to:
Tyler Robinson, co-founder of The Tyler Robinson Foundation
Tyler Robinson (singer), contestant on The Voice (US series 1)
Tyler Robinson (American football), member of the 2011 Kentucky Wildcats football team
Tyler Robinson (Canadian football), participated in the 1986 CFL Draft
Tyler Robinson (production designer), won the ADG Excellence in Production Design Award for the Portlandia episode Missionaries
Tyler Robinson (businessman), owner of Main Event Wrestling